Madeleine Dean Cunnane (born June 6, 1959) is an American lawyer and politician serving as the U.S. representative for Pennsylvania's 4th congressional district. The district includes almost all of Montgomery County, a suburban county north of Philadelphia. Before being elected to Congress, Dean was a Democratic member of the Pennsylvania General Assembly, representing the 153rd district in the Pennsylvania House of Representatives.

Early life and education 
The youngest of seven children, Madeleine Dean was born to Bob and Mary Dean in Glenside, Pennsylvania. She graduated from Abington Senior High School. She graduated magna cum laude from La Salle University, and earned her Juris Doctor at the Widener University Delaware Law School. She also studied politics and public service at the Fels Institute of Government of the University of Pennsylvania.

Career 
After law school, Dean returned to the Philadelphia area and practiced law with the Philadelphia Trial Lawyers, going on to serve as executive director. She then opened a small, three-woman law practice in Glenside, and served as in-house counsel for her husband's growing bicycle business.

While raising three young sons, Dean turned to teaching. She served 10 years as an assistant professor of English at her alma mater, La Salle University, in Philadelphia, where she taught writing and ethics.

Early political career 
Dean got her start in politics soon after graduating from high school, when she was elected to an Abington Township committee seat.

She volunteered on her first campaign, for Joe Hoeffel's reelection to the state legislature, in the same district seat she later held. On that campaign she met her future husband, Patrick Cunnane, then a 19-year-old elected committee-person.

Pennsylvania House of Representatives 
Having worked and volunteered in politics for decades, and her children grown, Dean was asked to become a public servant herself, serving as Abington Township commissioner, and ran for state representative in 2012. In the State House, she prioritized social issues such as addiction, equal rights, access to healthcare, ethics, criminal justice reform, and gun violence.

After the Sandy Hook Elementary School shooting, Dean and Dan Frankel co-founded the gun violence prevention caucus, PA SAFE Caucus. The caucus is a self-described coalition of legislators and advocates dedicated to curbing the sale of illegal guns.

In 2015, Dean was appointed to the Governor's Commission for Women, a commission designed to advise the governor on policies and legislation that promote equality issues ranging from sexual assault to business initiatives. In 2017, she was elected chair of the Southeast Delegation of the Pennsylvania House Democrats, composed of 22 House Democrats representing nine counties.

She served on several committees, including Appropriations, Judiciary, Policy, Urban Affairs, State Government, and Finance, of which she was vice-chair.

Dean stated in 2014: "We know that the number one issue with voters is education and how we fund our public schools". Regarding the Pennsylvania education budget for 2013, the then-state Representative said: "How we educate our kids tells us how our economy will be." In that same instance, she highlighted the issue of public school funding.

U.S. House of Representatives

Elections

2018 

In February 2018, after a significant change in Pennsylvania's congressional districts mandated by the Supreme Court of Pennsylvania, Dean announced she would end her campaign for lieutenant governor and instead run for Congress in the 4th district. The district had previously been the 13th, represented by two-term fellow Democrat Brendan Boyle. But the 13th's share of Philadelphia, including Boyle’s home, was drawn into the 2nd district, and Boyle opted to run for reelection there.

On May 15, Dean defeated two challengers, Shira Goodman and former Congressman Joe Hoeffel, in the Democratic primary. In the general election she defeated Republican Dan David with 63.45% of the vote to his 36.55%. She was one of four Democratic women elected to Congress from Pennsylvania in 2018. The others were Mary Gay Scanlon, Chrissy Houlahan and Susan Wild. The state's delegation had previously been all male.

2020 

Dean ran for reelection and defeated the Republican nominee, military veteran and political commentator Kathy Barnette, with 59.5% of the vote to Barnette's 40.5%.

2022 

Dean stood for re-election in 2022, but her district was mostly unchanged by redistricting. Dean faced Republican nominee Christian Nascimento, a vice president of product at Comcast and former Methacton School Board president, and won 61.3% of the vote.

Tenure
On January 12, 2021, Dean was named a manager for the second impeachment of Donald Trump.

Committee assignments 

 House Judiciary Committee
 House Committee on Foreign Affairs

Caucus memberships 

 Congressional Progressive Caucus
 Congressional Caucus for Women's Issues
New Democrat Coalition

Electoral history

Other political campaigns

Lieutenant governor

In November 2017, Dean announced her candidacy for lieutenant governor of Pennsylvania, facing, among others, incumbent Mike Stack in the Democratic primary. She dropped out to run for Congress.

Personal life 
Dean lives in Abington Township (with a Jenkintown address), with her husband, Patrick "P.J." Cunnane. Cunnane is an entrepreneur in the bicycle industry and managed Advanced Sports International. They have three grown sons and three grandchildren. Her son, Pat, was senior writer and deputy director of messaging in the Obama administration. Dean is Roman Catholic.

See also

 List of La Salle University people
 Women in the United States House of Representatives

References

External links

 Congresswoman Madeleine Dean official U.S. House website
Madeleine Dean for Congress

Madeleine Dean (D) state legislature profile

|-

|-

|-

1959 births
21st-century American politicians
Female members of the United States House of Representatives
Catholics from Pennsylvania
American Roman Catholics
La Salle University alumni
Democratic Party members of the United States House of Representatives from Pennsylvania
Living people
Democratic Party members of the Pennsylvania House of Representatives
Pennsylvania lawyers
Widener University alumni
Women state legislators in Pennsylvania
21st-century American women politicians